Joseph Kalang Tie (born 9 March 1987) is a Malaysian footballer who plays and serves as captain for Kuching City in the Malaysia Premier League. He formerly played for the Malaysia national team. 

Mainly as an attacking midfielder and a winger, he has also been deployed in central midfield. Joseph is known for his technical ability, creativity, pace, and ability to read the game. Of Borneo heritage, he is described as a player whose "vision and imagination make him an unpredictable opponent".

Personal life
Joseph was born in Long Ikang, a small village located in Marudi, Sarawak. He is of mixed parentage of Malaysian Chinese and Kenyah, an indigenous people of Borneo. He is married to Rebekah Livan Balan since 16 November 2014. The couple has two children, Kendrick Lian and Kylian Laing.

Career

Sarawak
Joseph Kalang Tie is a footballer who plays for Sarawak FA - his home state and the team he started his career with. Joseph is well known for his close control of the ball and good range of passing. He made his first appearance during the 2006/07 season, scoring two league goals and one goal in Malaysia Cup group match against PDRM. At age of 21 (Malaysia Super League 2007-08), Joseph became the youngest player to captain Sarawak.

Hartlepool United training stint
In October 2008, Joseph Kalang Tie was one of three players selected to attend a two-month training stint with English League One side Hartlepool United.

In Malaysia FA Cup 2009, Joseph scored his first ever senior team hattrick in 6-1 trashing over ATM FA.

He left Sarawak before the start of the 2009 Malaysia Cup seasons despite being the top scorer for the team in all competitions for 2009 seasons. He later joined Terengganu for the 2010 season. and is still regarded highly by their fans despite leaving at the end of the 2012 season. He was affectionately given the nickname "Messi Terengganu" because of his ability on the ball.

Terengganu
In 2011, Joseph won his first silverware with Terengganu after beating Kelantan 2-1 in 2011 Malaysia FA Cup. After 3 years with Terengganu, Joseph returned to Sarawak FA on 30 September 2012, having ended his contract with Terengganu 8 days earlier. He has since continued his fine form and is one of the stars of the Sarawak team who are currently chasing promotion to the Malaysian Super League.

Return to Sarawak
On 7 January, Joseph made his debut return for Sarawak in the 2–1 league opening game win against Perlis at Kangar Stadium.

Return to Terengganu
On 2 December 2015, Joseph signs for Terengganu FA for his second spell to the club.

Pahang

On 15 December 2016, Joseph signed another Super League club Pahang, on a one-year contract. He was handed the number 17 jersey ahead of the 2017 season. He made his official debut for the club on 21 January 2017 during the Super League season opener against Perak, which the match ended with a 1–1 draw.

On 18 February 2017, Joseph scored his first goal for the club in the 66th minute as part of a 6–1 home victory against Penang in the league matches.

Selangor

On 20 November 2017, Joseph signed as a free agent for Selangor on a one-year contract, which had the option of being extended depending on his performance for the club.

Style of play

In his early years at Sarawak FA, Joseph was deployed in several positions, most notably as a deep-lying midfielder and a wide midfielder primarily on the right side as he was deemed too small to play in the middle of the park. After three years of developing his physical traits, in the 2008 season, manager Kunju Jamaluddin inserted Joseph into the playmaker role, where his vision, technical skill, and ability to read and understand the game suited him. Since that season, Joseph has been primarily deployed in the position or as a central attacking midfielder at both club and international level. The player has personally admitted that playing centrally is his preference. However, as a result of his versatility, Joseph can also function on the wing and spent the majority of his career at Terangganu occupying the role in the team's 4–4–2 formation

International career
In July 2011, Joseph was called up to represent Malaysia Selection against Chelsea.

Joseph made his international debut for the Malaysia national team in a friendly match with Australia on 7 October 2011, which Malaysia lost heavily 5-0.

In 2015, Joseph and Ronny Harun was selected for a friendly match against Hong Kong which ended goalless under coach Dollah Salleh.

Career statistics

Club

International

International goals
''As of match played 20 September 2014. Malaysia score listed first, score column indicates score after each Joseph Kalang Tie goal.

Honours

Club

Terengganu FA
 Malaysia FA Cup: 2011

Sarawak FA
 Malaysia Premier League: 2013

Pahang FA 
 Malaysia FA Cup: Runners-up 2017

Kuching City 
 Malaysia M3 League: Runners-up 2019

References

External links
 Profil Atlet SUKMA XI Kedah 2006

1987 births
Living people
Malaysian footballers
People from Sarawak
Kelabit people
Malaysia international footballers
Sarawak FA players
Kuching City F.C. players
Malaysia Premier League players
Terengganu FC players
Malaysia Super League players
Association football midfielders